Zilpo Road is a National Forest Scenic Byway in the forested hills of eastern Kentucky in the United States. The  byway starts south of Salt Lick and can be accessed by Kentucky Route 211 (KY 2112). The byway travels through the Daniel Boone National Forest and ends on the western shore of Cave Run Lake at the Zilpo Recreation Area. It follows FSR 918, which is a two-lane paved road suitable for all motor vehicles and is usually open throughout the year.

Cave Run Lake is one of the main attractions of this byway. It is a  lake constructed on the Licking River by the Army Corps of Engineers. The Zilpo Recreation Area is a  park offering wooded campsites and a variety of facilities. On the other side of the lake is the  Twin Knobs Recreation Area. which has additional campsites.

References
Rowan County Chamber of Commerce

Transportation in Bath County, Kentucky
Roads in Kentucky
Protected areas of Bath County, Kentucky
Daniel Boone National Forest
National Forest Scenic Byways